Derek Kahn Thompson (born May 18, 1986) is an American journalist. He is a staff writer at The Atlantic and the author of Hit Makers: How to Succeed in an Age of Distraction.

Early life

Derek Thompson was born in McLean, Virginia, the son of Robert Thompson and Petra Kahn, both deceased.
Before graduating from high school, he appeared in several theatrical productions at the Folger Shakespeare Theater and the Shakespeare Theater. After attending the Potomac School, Thompson graduated from Northwestern University in 2008.

Career

Thompson has been a writer at The Atlantic since 2009. Starting in November 2021, Thompson began hosting a weekly headline podcast entitled Plain English, part of The Ringer Podcast Network. In 2018, he became the host of the technology and science podcast Crazy/Genius, which was nominated for an iHeartMedia Best Podcast Award in its first year.

Thompson has written two cover stories for the magazine. The first, "A World Without Work", is a widely referenced essay on the meaning of work and automation's threat to the labor force. The second was a lengthy profile of X, the research and development division of Alphabet.

In 2017, Thompson published his first book, Hit Makers: How to Succeed in an Age of Distraction. It was a national bestseller and winner of the American Marketing Association's Leonard L. Berry Marketing Book Award for the best marketing book of 2018.

On July 27, 2020, Thompson coined the term "hygiene theater" when referring to hygiene measures being taken during the COVID-19 pandemic that have done little to reduce the spread of COVID-19 and have provided a false sense of security.

Personal life

Thompson lives in Washington D.C.

Since 2016 he has been a member of Giving What We Can, a community of people who have pledged to give at least 10% of their income to effective charities.

References 

1986 births
Living people
The Atlantic (magazine) people
21st-century American journalists
American male journalists
American podcasters
Northwestern University alumni
People from McLean, Virginia
Journalists from Virginia